Dorothy Gertrude Howell (25 February 1898 – 12 January 1982) was an English composer and pianist.

Biography
Howell was born in Birmingham, grew up in Handsworth, and received a convent education.  She received private composition lessons from Granville Bantock before beginning her studies at the Royal Academy of Music, aged 15. Her teachers there included John Blackwood McEwen and Tobias Matthay.

Howell achieved fame with her symphonic poem Lamia (inspired by the Keats poem) which Sir Henry Wood premiered at The Proms on 10 September  1919.  Wood directed Lamia again that same week, on 13 September 1919.  He subsequently conducted Lamia again in the 1921, 1923, 1924, 1926, 1930 and 1940 Proms seasons, but in subsequent years Lamia was neglected, until its revival in the 2010 season of The Proms. It received a centenary performance at the Proms in 2019. Howell dedicated Lamia on its 1921 publication to Wood.  Among other compositions by Howell, Wood conducted Koong Shee in 1921, her Piano Concerto in 1923 and 1927 with the composer herself as pianist on both occasions, and The Rock in 1928.  He was scheduled to conduct the first performance of Three Divertissements in 1940, but the concert was cancelled owing to The Blitz. Her Air, Variations & Finale for oboe, violin & piano (1949) can be obtained from June Emerson Wind Music (E620). Three Divertissements, Howell's last known orchestral work, did not receive its premiere until the 1950 Elgar Festival in Malvern.

Howell won the Cobbett Prize in 1921 for her Phantasy for violin and piano.  She received the nickname of the "English Strauss" in her lifetime. Wood attempted to recruit Howell to his conducting class at the Royal Academy of Music (RAM) in 1923, but she instead became a teacher at the RAM in 1924.  During World War II, she served with the Women's Land Army.  She taught at the Royal Birmingham Conservatoire from 1950–57. She retired from the RAM in 1970, and after her retirement, continued to teach students privately. She died in Malvern, aged 83.

Howell tended the grave of Sir Edward Elgar for several years, and herself is buried near Elgar in the churchyard of St Wulstan's Roman Catholic Church, Little Malvern.  Her music has been recorded commercially on the Dutton Digital and Harlequin labels.

The Cameo Classics label recorded Lamia in 2008 with Marius Stravinsky conducting the first modern recording of Howell's orchestral music with the Karelia Symphony Orchestra. In 2010 Cameo Classics recorded Howell's Piano Concerto with Valentina Seferinova as soloist at Cadogan Hall. The conductor was Toby Purser with his Orion Symphony Orchestra of London, with the CD (CC9041CD) released in September 2012. The CDs are now available from Nimbus Wyastone.

In 2019 Rumon Gamba conducted the BBC Philharmonic in a recording of Lamia and other British tone poems for Chandos Records.

She is one of the subjects of a 2023 group biography of four women composers, published by Faber and Faber.

Selected works

 Piano Sonata (1916)
 Lamia (1918, symphonic poem)
 Danse grotesque (1919, for orchestra)
 Two Dances (1920, for orchestra)
 Humoresque (1921, for orchestra)
 Koong Shee (1921, revised 1933, for orchestra)
 Minuet (1923 for orchestra)
 Concerto for pianoforte (1923)
 Two Pieces for Muted Strings (1926)

 The Moorings for violin and piano
 Phantasy for violin and piano
 Three Preludes for piano
 The Rock (1928, for orchestra)
 Fanfare (composed for the Musicians' Benevolent Fund)
 Three Divertissements
 Violin Sonata (1947)
 Piano Sonata (1955)

References

External links 
 Presto Classical page with selected list of Dorothy Howell works
 Oxford Dictionary of National Biography page on Dorothy Howell
 Encyclopedia.com page on Dorothy Howell
 Musicweb International page, "An Eighty-Eighth Garland of British Light Music Composers
 BBC Proms – Performances of works by Dorothy Howell
 The life and works of Dorothy Howell  - MA Thesis by V J Byrne (2015) 
Birmingham Libraries article on Dorothy Howell

English classical composers
1898 births
1982 deaths
Women classical composers
Musicians from Birmingham, West Midlands
English classical pianists
English women pianists
Alumni of the Royal Academy of Music
Academics of the Royal Academy of Music
20th-century classical composers
20th-century classical pianists
20th-century English composers
20th-century English women musicians
People from Handsworth, West Midlands
Women music educators
Women classical pianists
20th-century women composers
20th-century women pianists